The Bordeaux Congress was the fifteenth national congress of the French Socialist Party (Parti socialiste or PS). It took place from 10 to 12 July 1992.

Results

No motions vote was held. The directional text proposed by the leadership won 85.30% of the votes.

Laurent Fabius was re-elected as First Secretary.

References

Congresses of the Socialist Party (France)
1992 in France
1992 in politics
1992 conferences